João Graneiro (born 22 February 1957) is a Brazilian volleyball player. He competed in the men's tournament at the 1980 Summer Olympics.

References

External links
 

1957 births
Living people
Brazilian men's volleyball players
Olympic volleyball players of Brazil
Volleyball players at the 1980 Summer Olympics
Sportspeople from Mato Grosso do Sul